Charles Tiffany may refer to:

 Charles Lewis Tiffany (1812–1902), American businessman and founder of New York City's Tiffany & Co.
 Charles Comfort Tiffany (1829–1907), American Episcopal clergyman